Super Sunday (also called Super Saturday) was a 1980s American animated television series produced by Sunbow Productions and Marvel Productions. It was distributed by Claster Television.

Super Sunday was a half-hour block with four six-minute matinée segments of Jem, Bigfoot and the Muscle Machines, Robotix, and Inhumanoids. It aired on various television stations in syndication on Sunday mornings from October 6, 1985 to October 1986. In markets that the series aired on Saturday, the series was retitled Super Saturday. All four segments were based on Hasbro toy lines.

History
The block began as Super Week, a five-day tryout that featured the first five chapters of Robotix while beginning Bigfoot and the Muscle Machines.

The series were cycled through, and only two or three of the four different segments appeared in a given episode. 

Despite all four shorts being collected into stand-alone made-for-TV movies (as was done with previous Sunbow/Marvel collaborations G.I. Joe and The Transformers), only Inhumanoids and Jem went on to be expanded into independent full-length shows.

Stations

References

External links
 
 
 

 
1980s American animated television series
1980s American anthology television series
1985 American television series debuts
1986 American television series endings
American children's animated action television series
American children's animated adventure television series
American children's animated anthology television series
American children's animated fantasy television series
First-run syndicated television programs in the United States
Television series by Marvel Productions
Television series by Sunbow Entertainment
Television series by Claster Television